St Gregory's Catholic High School is a committed Roman Catholic co-educational voluntary aided comprehensive school that educates approximately 970 children between 11 and 16 years of age. The school is located in Great Sankey, Cheshire.

References
 Current OFSTED report

External links
 

Catholic secondary schools in the Diocese of Shrewsbury
Secondary schools in Warrington
Voluntary aided schools in England